Burnt Quarter is a historic plantation house located near Dinwiddie, Dinwiddie County, Virginia. It was built in stages starting about 1750, and consists of a two-story, hipped roof central section flanked by -story wings. On April 1, 1865, the property became the scene of the decisive Battle of Five Forks. During the battle the house served both as headquarters for Union General Merritt and as a military hospital. On the grounds is a monument to six unknown Confederate soldiers killed in the Battle of Five Forks.

It was listed on the National Register of Historic Places in 1969.

References

External links
Burnt Quarter, State Route 613 vicinity, Dinwiddie, Dinwiddie County, VA: 1 photo and 2 data pages at Historic American Buildings Survey

Plantation houses in Virginia
Houses on the National Register of Historic Places in Virginia
National Register of Historic Places in Dinwiddie County, Virginia
Houses completed in 1750
Houses in Dinwiddie County, Virginia